The Caguán River is a river of Colombia. It is a tributary of the Caquetá River in the Amazon River basin.

It defines the eastern boundary of the Napo moist forests ecoregion.

See also
List of rivers of Colombia

References

Rivers of Colombia